Mouloudia Club d'Alger, referred to as MC Alger or MCA for short, is an Algerian basketball team that was founded on 7 August 1921, as a division of the of MC Alger. They play their home games in the Hacène Harcha Arena, which has a capacity of 8,000 people. The team has won a record twenty Algerian national championships, as well as twenty Algerian Cups.

History
The team was originally part of the Mouloudia Club d'Alger (MC Alger) club, but became a part of Groupement Sportif des Pétroliers (English: Sports Group of Oil Fields) on 2 June 2008. Starting from the 1999–2000 season, the team has won numerous titles in Algeria. 

On 30 November 2019, GSP qualified for the 2020 Basketball Africa League (BAL) by winning the West Division in the qualifying tournament. The season was later re-scheduled to 2021 due to the COVID-19 pandemic. GSP lost its three game in the group stage.

From 2008 to 2020, the team was known as GS Pétroliers as it was part of the multi-sports club with that name.

The team's name changed back to MC Alger in 2020.

Season-by-season record

Honours

National
Super Division
Champions (20): 1983, 1985, 1986, 1987, 1989, 2000, 2001, 2003, 2004, 2005, 2006, 2008, 2010, 2011, 2012, 2014, 2015, 2016, 2017, 2018, 2019

Algerian Cup
Champions (20):1983, 1985, 1986, 1989, 1993, 2003, 2004, 2005, 2006, 2008, 2009, 2011, 2012, 2013, 2014, 2015, 2016, 2017, 2018, 2019

International
Arab Championship
Runners-up (4): 1987, 2001, 2002, 2015
Third place (1): 2004

References

External links
Team profile at Eurobasket.com

Groupement Sportif des Pétroliers
Basketball teams in Algeria
Sport in Algiers
Basketball teams established in 1921
Basketball Africa League teams
1921 establishments in Algeria
Road to BAL teams